Jörgen Pääjärvi (born 10 March 1969) is a Swedish freestyle skier. He competed at the 1992 Winter Olympics and the 1994 Winter Olympics.

References

External links
 

1969 births
Living people
Swedish male freestyle skiers
Olympic freestyle skiers of Sweden
Freestyle skiers at the 1992 Winter Olympics
Freestyle skiers at the 1994 Winter Olympics
People from Gällivare Municipality
Sportspeople from Norrbotten County
20th-century Swedish people